Sunny Sunberg (Swedish:Soliga Solberg) is a 1941 Swedish comedy film directed by Emil A. Lingheim and starring Edvard Persson, Märta Arbin and Anna-Greta Krigström.

The film's art direction was by Max Linder.

Main cast
 Edvard Persson as Gunnar Solberg  
 Märta Arbin as Mrs. Solberg  
 Anna-Greta Krigström as Lotten Solberg  
 Göran Bernhard as Per Solberg  
 Tord Andersén as Kalle Andersson  
 Tord Bernheim as Frasse Olsson  
 Hugo Björne as Carlesson  
 Gerda Björne as Mrs. Carlesson  
 Nils Nordståhl as Jan Carlesson  
 Inger Sundberg as Lisa Carlesson 
 Bullan Weijden as Opera Singer  
 Holger Sjöberg as Opera singer  
 Carin Swensson as Maid 
 Astrid Bodin as Housemaid  
 Erik Rosén as Child care officer  
 Arne Lindblad as Salesman  
 Sten Meurk as Waiter

References

Bibliography 
 Qvist, Per Olov & von Bagh, Peter. Guide to the Cinema of Sweden and Finland. Greenwood Publishing Group, 2000.

External links 
 

1941 films
1941 comedy films
Swedish comedy films
1940s Swedish-language films
Films directed by Emil A. Lingheim
Swedish black-and-white films
1940s Swedish films